
Laguna Verde (Spanish for "green lake") is a salt lake in an endorheic basin, in the southwestern Altiplano in Bolivia. It is located in the Sur Lípez Province of the Potosí Department. It is close to the Chilean border, at the foot of the volcano Licancabur.

Geography
The Laguna Verde is a lake at  elevation. It is at the southwestern extremity of the Eduardo Avaroa Andean Fauna National Reserve and Bolivia itself. It has mineral suspensions of arsenic and other minerals which renders colour to the lake waters. Its color varies from turquoise to dark emerald depending on the disturbance caused to sediments in the lake by winds.

The shorelines west and east of the lake have different characteristics, with the western  and southern shores eroded into volcanoes. Geothermal heat warms waters that then emerge into Laguna Blanca through springs, the lakes are otherwise fed by snowfall.

In the past, the lake was at least  higher and larger than today, during the last glacial maximum it merged with neighbouring Laguna Blanca. Former highstands have left 30 major and 12 minor shorelines. The lake extended far east of its present-day shore. A maximum water level was reached 13,240 years before present. The two lakes today are only connected by a single channel and their properties are quite different. Environmental conditions have been compared to those on the planet Mars, and Laguna Verde has been cited as an example of how a lake on Mars would have evolved.

The lake is one of Bolivia's most important tourism targets. Stromatolites of various shapes and sizes occur at Laguna Verde, they cover an area of over  but are inactive today. Presumably, they grew around 20,000-10,000 years ago. Presently, smaller structures and microbial mats formed by cyanobacteria still occur at Laguna Verde. Mining tailings are found at its shores. The bacterial species Chromohalobacter sarecensis was discovered at Laguna Verde. Despite their connection, Laguna Verde and Laguna Blanca have distinctly different biological and chemical traits.

See also
Laguna Blanca (Bolivia) — a salt lake also in Eduardo Avaroa Andean Fauna National Reserve.
Altiplano region

References

External links

Verde
Verde
Hot springs of South America